In narrative, heroes and villains are character archetypes of good and evil, respectively.

Heroes and Villains may also mean:

Music
 "Heroes and Villains", a 1967 song by the Beach Boys
 Heroes and Villains: The True Story of the Beach Boys, a 1986 biography of the band
 Heroes and Villains, a 2003 album by Paloalto
 Heroes and Villains, an American indie-rock band
 Heroes & Villains, the first soundtrack from The Powerpuff Girls
 "Heroes, Villains, and Cows", a deleted song from Disney's 2004 film, Home on the Range
 Heroes & Villains, a 2022 album from producer Metro Boomin

Literature
 Heroes and Villains (novel), a 1969 novel by Angela Carter

Television
Heroes and Villains, a three-episode 1994 BBC series of docudramas produced by Tiger Aspect Productions
 Heroes and Villains (TV series), a six-episode 2007-2008 BBC series of docudramas
 "Heroes and Villains" (Only Fools and Horses), a 1996 episode of the BBC sitcom Only Fools and Horses
 "Heroes and Villains" (Once Upon a Time), an episode from the fourth season of the TV series Once Upon a Time
 "Heroes and Villains", the first episode of Spider-Man: The New Animated Series.
 AFI's 100 Years... 100 Heroes and Villains, a 2003 television special from the American Film Institute
 Heroes: Villains, title of the third story arc of Heroes (TV series)
 Survivor: Heroes vs. Villains season of Survivor pitting the "greatest heroes" against the "greatest villains"

See also
 Hero (disambiguation)
 Villain (disambiguation)